The 2012 Men's Junior NORCECA Volleyball Championship was the eight edition of the bi-annual Volleyball Tournament, played by eight countries from August 27 – September 1, 2012 in Colorado Springs, Colorado, United States. The top three teams will qualify to the 2013 Men's Junior World Championship.

Teams

Pool standing procedure
Match won 3–0: 5 points for the winner, 0 point for the loser
Match won 3–1: 4 points for the winner, 1 points for the loser
Match won 3–2: 3 points for the winner, 2 points for the loser
In case of tie, the teams were classified according to the following criteria:
points ratio and sets ratio

First round
 ''All times are MST, Colorado Standard Time (UTC -07)

Pool A

Pool B

Final round

Championship bracket

5th–8th places bracket

Quarterfinals

5th to 8th Classification

Semifinals

7th place match

5th place match

3rd place match

Final

Final standing

Individual awards

Most Valuable Player

Best Scorer

Best Spiker

Best Blocker

Best Server

Best Digger

Best Setter

Best Receiver

Best Libero

References

External links
 

2012
2012 in volleyball
2012 in sports in Colorado
Volleyball competitions in the United States
August 2012 sports events in the United States
September 2012 sports events in the United States
Volleyball in Colorado